Tallinn is the capital and most populous city of Estonia. Situated on a bay in north Estonia, on the shore of the Gulf of Finland of the Baltic Sea, Tallinn has a population of 437,811 (as of 2022) and administratively lies in the Harju maakond (county). Tallinn is the main financial, industrial, and cultural centre of Estonia. From the 13th century until the first half of the 20th century, Tallinn was known in most of the world by variants of its other historical name Reval.

Tallinn received Lübeck city rights in 1248, however the earliest evidence of human population in the area dates back nearly 5,000 years. The medieval indigenous population of what is now Tallinn and northern Estonia was one of the last "pagan" civilisations in Europe to adopt Christianity following the Papal-sanctioned Livonian Crusade in the 13th century. The first recorded claim over the place was laid by Denmark after a successful raid in 1219 led by King Valdemar II, followed by a period of alternating Scandinavian and Teutonic rulers. Due to the strategic location by the sea, its medieval port became a significant trade hub, especially in the 14–16th centuries, when Tallinn grew in importance as the northernmost member city of the Hanseatic League. Tallinn Old Town is one of the best-preserved medieval cities in Europe and is listed as a UNESCO World Heritage Site.

Tallinn has the highest number of startup companies per person among all capitals and larger cities in Europe and is the birthplace of many international high-technology companies, including Skype and Wise. The city is home to the headquarters of the European Union's IT agency, and to the NATO Cyber Defence Centre of Excellence.
In 2007, Tallinn was listed among the top-10 digital cities in the world, and in 2022, Tallinn was listed among the top-10 "medium-sized European cities of the future".

Etymology 

In 1154, a town called  (Qlwn or Quwri) was recorded in the description of the world upon the world map (Tabula Rogeriana) commissioned by the Norman King Roger II of Sicily and compiled by Arab cartographer Muhammad al-Idrisi, who described it as "a small town like a large castle" among the towns of 'Astlanda'. It has been suggested that one possible transcription, 'Qlwn', may have denoted a predecessor of the modern city and may somehow be related to a toponym Kolyvan, which has been discovered from later East Slavic chronicles. However, a number of modern historians have considered connecting any of al-Idrisi's placenames with modern Tallinn erroneous, unfounded, or speculative.

Henry of Livonia, in his chronicle (ca. 1229), called the town with the name that is also known to have been used up to the 13th century by Scandinavians: Lindanisa (or Lyndanisse in Danish, Lindanäs in Swedish and Ledenets in Old East Slavic).

The Icelandic Njal's saga—composed after 1270, but describing events between 960 and 1020—mentions an event that occurred somewhere in the area of Tallinn and calls the place Rafala (probably a derivation of Rävala, Revala, or some other variant of the Estonian name of the adjacent medieval Estonian county). Soon after the Danish conquest in 1219, the town became known in the Scandinavian and German languages as Reval. Reval was in official use in Estonia until 1918.

The name Tallinn(a) is Estonian. It has been widely considered a historical derivation of Taani-linna, meaning "Danish-castle", conceivably because the Danish invaders built the castle in place of the Estonian stronghold after the 1219 battle of Lyndanisse. The Finnic element -linna, like Germanic -burg and Slavic -grad /-gorod, originally meant "fortress", but has been used as a suffix in the formation of town names.

In international use, the English and German-language  as well as the Russian analog Revel were all gradually replaced by the Estonian name after the country became independent in 1918. At first, both Estonian forms, Tallinna and Tallinn, were used. Tallinna in Estonian denotes also the genitive case of the name, as in Tallinna Sadam ('the Port of Tallinn').

History 

The first archaeological traces of a small hunter-fisherman community's presence in what is now Tallinn's city centre are about 5,000 years old. The comb ceramic pottery found on the site dates to about 3000 BCE and corded ware pottery around 2500 BCE.
Around 1050 AD, a fortress was built in what is now central Tallinn, on the hill of Toompea.

As an important port on a major trade route between Novgorod and western Europe, it became a target for the expansion of the Teutonic Knights and the Kingdom of Denmark during the period of Northern Crusades in the beginning of the 13th century when Christianity was forcibly imposed on the local population. Danish rule of Tallinn and northern Estonia started in 1219.

In 1285, Tallinn, then known more widely as Reval, became the northernmost member of the Hanseatic League – a mercantile and military alliance of German-dominated cities in Northern Europe. The king of Denmark sold Reval along with other land possessions in northern Estonia to the Teutonic Knights in 1346. Reval was arguably the most significant medieval port in the Gulf of Finland, the second-most important port being Turku. Reval enjoyed a strategic position at the crossroads of trade between the rest of western Europe and Novgorod and Muscovy in the east. The city, with a population of about 8,000, was very well fortified with city walls and 66 defence towers.

A weather vane, the figure of an old warrior called Old Thomas, was put on top of the spire of the Tallinn Town Hall in 1530. Old Thomas later became a popular symbol of the city.

In the early years of the Protestant Reformation, the city converted to Lutheranism. In 1561, Reval (Tallinn) became a dominion of Sweden.

During the 1700–1721 Great Northern War, plague-stricken Tallinn along with Swedish Estonia and Livonia capitulated to Tsardom of Russia (Muscovy) in 1710, but the local self-government institutions (Magistracy of Reval and Estonian Knighthood) retained their cultural and economical autonomy within Imperial Russia as the Governorate of Estonia. The Magistracy of Reval was abolished in 1889. The 19th century brought industrialisation of the city and the port kept its importance.

On 24 February 1918, the Estonian Declaration of Independence was proclaimed in Tallinn. It was followed by Imperial German occupation until the end of World War I in November 1918, after which Tallinn became the capital of independent Estonia. During World War II, Estonia was first occupied by the Soviet army and annexed into the USSR in the summer of 1940, then occupied by Nazi Germany from 1941 to 1944. During the German occupation Tallinn suffered from many instances of aerial bombing by the Soviet air force. During the most destructive Soviet bombing raid on 9–10 March 1944, over a thousand incendiary bombs were dropped on the town, causing widespread fires, killing 757 people, and leaving over 20,000 residents of Tallinn without shelter. After the German retreat in September 1944, the city was occupied again by the Soviet Union. 

During the 1980 Summer Olympics, the sailing (then known as yachting) events were held at Pirita, north-east of central Tallinn. Many buildings, such as the Tallinn TV Tower, "Olümpia" hotel, the new Main Post Office building, and the Regatta Centre, were built for the Olympics.

In 1991, the independent democratic Estonian nation was restored and a period of quick development as a modern European capital ensued. Tallinn became the capital of a de facto independent country once again on 20 August 1991. The Old Town became a World Heritage Site in 1997, and the city hosted the 2002 Eurovision Song Contest. Tallinn was the 2011 European Capital of Culture, and is the 2023 European Green Capital Award. The city has pledged to cut greenhouse gas emissions by 40% by 2030 and takes pride in its biodiversity and high air quality. But critics say that the award was received on false promises since it won the title with its "15-minute city" concept, according to which key facilities and services should be accessible within a 15-minute walk or bike ride  but the concept was left out of the green capital program and other parts of the 12 million euro program amount to a collection of temporary and one-off projects without any structural and lasting changes.

Geography 

Tallinn is situated on the southern coast of the Gulf of Finland, in north-western Estonia.

The largest lake in Tallinn is Lake Ülemiste, which serves as the main source of the city's drinking water. The only significant river in Tallinn nowadays is the Pirita River, in the eponymous Pirita city district. Historically, a smaller river, called Härjapea, flowed from Lake Ülemiste through the town into the sea, but the river was diverted into underground sewerage system in the 1930s and has since completely disappeared from the cityscape. References to it still remain in the street names Jõe (from jõgi, river) and Kivisilla (from kivi sild, stone bridge).

A limestone cliff runs through the city. It can be seen at Toompea, Lasnamäe, and Astangu. However, Toompea is not a part of the cliff, but a separate hill.

The highest point in Tallinn, at 64 m (about 200 ft) above sea level, is situated in Hiiu, Nõmme District, in the south-west of the city.

It comprises three bigger peninsulas: Kopli, Paljassaare, and Kakumäe Peninsulas. The city has a number of public beaches, including those at Pirita, Stroomi, Kakumäe, Harku, and Pikakari.

The geology under the city of Tallinn is made up of rocks and sediments of different composition and age. Youngest are the Quaternary deposits. The materials of these deposits are till, varved clay, sand, gravel, and pebbles that are of glacial, marine and lacustrine origin. Some of the Quaternary deposits are valuable as they constitute aquifers, or as in the case of gravels and sands, are used as construction materials. The Quaternary deposits are the fill of valleys that are now buried. The buried valleys of Tallinn are carved into older rock likely by ancient rivers to be later modified by glaciers. While the valley fill is made up of Quaternary sediments the valleys themselves originated from erosion that took place before the Quaternary. The substrate into which the buried valleys were carved is made up of hard sedimentary rock of Ediacaran, Cambrian and Ordovician age. Only the upper layer of Ordovician rocks protrudes from the cover of younger deposits, cropping out in the Baltic Klint at the coast and at a few places inland. The Ordovician rocks are made up from top to bottom of a thick layer of limestone and marlstone, then a first layer of argillite followed by first layer of sandstone and siltstone and then another layer of argillite also followed by sandstone and siltstone. In other places of the city, hard sedimentary rock is only to be found beneath Quaternary sediments at depths reaching as much as 120 m below sea level. Underlying the sedimentary rock are the rocks of the Fennoscandian Craton including gneisses and other metamorphic rocks with volcanic rock protoliths and rapakivi granites. These rocks are much older than the rest (Paleoproterozoic age) and do not crop out anywhere in Estonia.

Climate 
Tallinn has a humid continental climate (Köppen climate classification Dfb) with mild, rainy summers and cold, snowy winters. Winters are cold, but mild for its latitude, owing to its coastal location. During the winters, temperatures tend to hover close to freezing, but mild spells of weather can push temperatures above , occasionally reaching above  while cold air masses can push temperatures below  an average of 6 days a year. Snowfall is common during the winters, which are cloudy and  characterised by low amounts of sunshine, ranging from only 20.7 hours of sunshine per month in December to 58.8 hours in February.

Spring starts out cool, with freezing temperatures common in March and April, but gradually becomes warmer in May, when daytime temperatures average , although nighttime temperatures still remain cool, averaging  from March to May. Snowfall is common in March and can occur in April.

During summer, partly cloudy or clear days are common and it is the sunniest season, ranging from 255.6 hours of sunshine in August to 312.1 hours in July although precipitation is higher during these months. As a consequence of its high latitude, at the summer solstice, daylight lasts for more than 18 hours and 30 minutes.

In the early parts of fall, temperatures commonly reach  and at least one day above  in September. In late fall, freezing temperatures become more common and snowfall can occur.

The average humidity is 81%, ranging from a high of 89% to a low of 69% in May.

According to a 2021 study commissioned by the British price comparison site Uswitch.com, Tallinn is the most unpredictable of European capitals in terms of weather conditions, with a total score of 69/100; the high score is mainly due to the high number of rainy days in the city and the variation in the duration of sunshine. Riga and Helsinki took second and third places.

Administrative districts 

Tallinn is subdivided into eight administrative linnaosa (districts). Each district has a linnaosa valitsus (district government) which is managed by a linnaosavanem (district elder) who is appointed by the city government. The function of the "district governments" however is not directly governing, but just limited to providing advice to the city government and the city council on issues related to the administration of respective districts. 

The districts are administratively further divided into 84 asum (subdistricts or "neighbourhoods" with officially defined borders).

Demographics 

Tallinn is the most populous, primate, and capital city of Estonia. 

The population of Tallinn on 1 January 2021 was 438,341. It is the most populous and primate city of Estonia, and the 59th most populated city in the EU.

According to Eurostat, in 2004, Tallinn had one of the largest number of non-EU nationals of all EU member states' capital cities. Ethnic Russians are a significant minority in Tallinn, as around a third of the city's residents are first and second generation immigrants from Russia and other parts of the former Soviet Union; a majority of the Soviet-era immigrants now hold Estonian citizenship.

Ethnic Estonians made up over 80% of Tallinn's population before World War II. As of 2022, ethnic Estonians made up over 53% of the population. Tallinn was one of the urban areas with industrial and military significance in northern Estonia that during the period of Soviet occupation underwent extensive russification of its ethnic composition due to large influx of immigrants from Russia and other parts of the former USSR. Whole new city districts were built where the main intent of the then Soviet authorities was to accommodate Russian-speaking immigrants: Mustamäe, Väike-Õismäe, Pelguranna, and most notably, Lasnamäe, which in 1980s became, and is to this day, the most populous district of Tallinn.

The official language of Tallinn is Estonian. As of 2011, 50.1% of the city's residents were native speakers of Estonian, whereas 46.7% had Russian as their first language. While English is the most frequently used foreign language by the residents of Tallinn, there are also a significant number of native speakers of Ukrainian and Finnish.

Religion

Economy 

Tallinn has a highly diversified economy with particular strengths in information technology, tourism and logistics. Over half of the Estonian GDP is created in Tallinn. In 2008, the GDP per capita of Tallinn stood at 172% of the Estonian average.
In addition to longtime functions as seaport and capital city, Tallinn has seen development of an information technology sector; in its 13 December 2005, edition, The New York Times characterised Estonia as "a sort of Silicon Valley on the Baltic Sea". One of Tallinn's sister cities is the Silicon Valley town of Los Gatos, California. Skype is one of the best-known of several Estonian start-ups originating from Tallinn. Many start-ups have originated from the Institute of Cybernetics. In recent years, Tallinn has gradually been becoming one of the main IT centres of Europe, with the Cooperative Cyber Defence Centre of Excellence (CCD COE) of NATO, eu-LISA, the EU Digital Agency and the IT development centres of large corporations, such as TeliaSonera and Kuehne + Nagel being based in the city. Smaller start-up incubators like Garage48 and Game Founders have helped to provide support to teams from Estonia and around the world looking for support, development and networking opportunities.

Tallinn receives 4.3 million visitors annually, a figure that has grown steadily over the past decade. The Finns are especially a common sight in Tallinn; on average, about 20,000–40,000 Finnish tourists visit the city between June and October. Most of the visitors come from Europe, though Tallinn has also become increasingly visited by tourists from the Asia-Pacific region.
Tallinn Passenger Port is one of the busiest cruise destinations on the Baltic Sea, it served more than 520,000 cruise passengers in 2013. 

Eesti Energia, the national energy company,; Elering, the national electric power transmission system operator; Eesti Gaas, the national natural gas distribution company; Alexela Group, the country's largest private energy company, all have their headquarters in Tallinn. 

Tallinn is the financial centre of Estonia and also a strong economic centre in the Scandinavian-Baltic region. Many major banks, such as SEB, Swedbank, and Nordea, have their local offices in Tallinn. LHV Pank, an Estonian investment bank, has its corporate headquarters in Tallinn. Tallinn Stock Exchange, part of NASDAQ OMX Group, is the only regulated exchange in Estonia.

Port of Tallinn is one of the biggest ports in the Baltic sea region, whereas the largest cargo port of Estonia, the Port of Muuga, which is operated by the same business entity, is located in the neighboring town of Maardu. Old City Harbour has been known as a convenient harbour since the medieval times, but nowadays the cargo operations are shifted to Muuga Cargo Port and Paldiski South Harbour. As of 2010, there was still a small fleet of oceangoing trawlers that operated out of Tallinn.
Tallinn's industries include shipbuilding, machine building, metal processing, electronics, textile manufacturing. BLRT Grupp has its headquarters and some subsidiaries in Tallinn. Air Maintenance Estonia and AS Panaviatic Maintenance, both based in Tallinn Airport, provide MRO services for aircraft, largely expanding their operations in recent years. 
Liviko, the maker of the internationally-known Vana Tallinn liqueur, is similarly based in Tallinn. The headquarters of Kalev, a confectionery company and part of the industrial conglomerate Orkla Group, is located in Lehmja, near the city's southeastern boundary.
Estonia is ranked third in Europe in terms of shopping centre space per inhabitant, ahead of Sweden and being surpassed only by Norway and Luxembourg.

Notable headquarters 
Among others:
NATO Cooperative Cyber Defence Centre of Excellence (CCDCOE)
eu-LISA, the European Agency for the operational management of large-scale IT systems in the area of freedom, security and justice is based in Tallinn.
Skype has its software development centre located in Tallinn.
Telia Company has its IT development centre located in Tallinn.
Kuehne + Nagel has its IT centre located in Tallinn.
Arvato Financial Solutions has its global IT development and innovation centre located in Tallinn.
Ericsson has one of its biggest production facilities in Europe located in Tallinn, focusing on the production of 4G communication devices.
Equinor has announced moving the group's financial centre to Tallinn.
Bolt
Alexela
LHV

Education 

Institutions of higher education and science include:

 Baltic Film and Media School
 Estonian Academy of Arts
 Estonian Academy of Security Sciences
 Estonian Academy of Music and Theatre
 Estonian Business School
 Estonian Maritime Academy
 Institute of Theology of the Estonian Evangelical Lutheran Church
 National Institute of Chemical Physics and Biophysics
 Tallinn University
 Tallinn University of Technology
 Tallinn University of Applied Sciences

Culture 

Tallinn was a European Capital of Culture for 2011, along with Turku, Finland.

Museums

 Tallinn is home to more than 60 museums and galleries. Most of them are located in Kesklinn, the central district of the city, and cover Tallinn's rich history.

One of the most visited historical museums in Tallinn is the Estonian History Museum, located in Great Guild Hall at Vanalinn, the old part of the city. It covers Estonia's history from prehistoric times up until the end of the 20th century. It features film and hands-on displays that show how Estonian dwellers lived and survived.

The Estonian Maritime Museum provides an overview of nation's seafaring past. The museum is located in the Old Town, inside one of Tallinn's former defensive structures – Fat Margaret's Tower. Another historical museum that can be found at city's Old Town, just behind the Town Hall, is Tallinn City Museum. It covers Tallinn's history from pre-history until 1991, when Estonia regained its independence. Tallinn City Museum owns nine more departments and museums around the city, one of which is Tallinn's Museum of Photography, also located just behind the Town Hall. It features permanent exhibition that covers 100 years of photography in Estonia.

Estonia's Vabamu Museum of Occupations and Freedom is located in Kesklinn (the Central district). It covers the 51 years (1940–1991) when Estonia was occupied by the former Soviet Union and Nazi Germany. Not far away is another museum related to the Soviet occupation of Estonia, the KGB Museum, which occupies the 23rd floor of Sokos Hotel Viru. It features equipment, uniforms, and documents of Russian Secret Service agents.

The city is also home to Estonian Museum of Natural History and the Museum of Health Care, both located in Old Town. The Museum of Natural History features several themed exhibitions that provide an overview of the wildlife of Estonia and the world. The Museum of Health Care has exhibitions covering human anatomy, health care, and the history of medicine in Estonia on display.

Tallinn is home to several art and design museums. The Estonian Art Museum, the largest art museum in Estonia, consists of four branches – Kumu Art Museum, Kadriorg Art Museum, Mikkel Museum, and Niguliste Museum. Kumu Art Museum features the country's largest collection of contemporary and modern art. It also displays Estonian art starting from the early 18th century. Those who are interested in Western European and Russian art may enjoy Kadriorg Art Museum collections, located in Kadriorg Palace, a beautiful Baroque building erected by Peter the Great. It stores and displays about 9,000 works of art from the 16th to 20th centuries. The Mikkel Museum, in Kadriorg Park, displays a collection of mainly Western art – ceramics and Chinese porcelain donated by Johannes Mikkel in 1994. The Niguliste Museum occupies former St. Nicholas' Church; it displays collections of historical ecclesiastical art spanning nearly seven centuries from the Middle Ages to post-Reformation art.

Those that are interested in design and applied art may enjoy the Estonian Museum of Applied Art and Design collection of Estonian contemporary designs. It displays up to 15.000 pieces of work made of textile art, ceramics, porcelain, leather, glass, jewellery, metalwork, furniture, and product design. To experience more relaxed, culture-oriented exhibits, one may turn to Museum of Estonian Drinking Culture. This museum showcases the historic Luscher & Matiesen Distillery as well as the history of Estonian alcohol production.

Lauluväljak

The Estonian Song Festival (in Estonian: Laulupidu) is one of the largest choral events in the world, listed by the UNESCO as a Masterpiece of the Oral and Intangible Heritage of Humanity. It is held every five years in July on the Tallinn Song Festival Grounds (Lauluväljak) simultaneously with the Estonian Dance Festival. The joint choir has comprised more than 30,000 singers performing to an audience of 80,000.

Estonians have one of the biggest collections of folk songs in the world, with written records of about 133,000 folk songs. From 1987, a cycle of mass demonstrations featuring spontaneous singing of national songs and hymns that were strictly forbidden during the years of the Soviet occupation to peacefully resist the oppression. In September 1988, a record 300,000 people, more than a quarter of all Estonians, gathered in Tallinn for a song festival.

Tallinn Black Nights Film Festival

Tallinn Black Nights Film Festival (Estonian: Pimedate Ööde Filmifestival, or PÖFF), is an annual film festival held since 1997 in Tallinn, the capital city of Estonia. PÖFF is the only festival in the Nordic and Baltic region with a FIAPF (International Federation of Film Producers Association) accreditation for holding an international competition programme in the Nordic and Baltic region with 14 other non-specialised festivals, such as Cannes, Berlin, Venice. With over 250 feature films screened each year and over 77500 attendances (2014), PÖFF is one of the largest film events of Northern Europe and cultural events in Estonia in the winter season.  During its 19th edition in 2015 the festival screened more than 600 films (including 250+ feature-length films from 80 countries), bringing over 900 screenings to an audience of over 80, 000 people as well as over 700 accredited guests and journalists from 50 countries. In 2010 the festival held the European Film Awards ceremony in Tallinn.

Cuisine

The traditional cuisine of Tallinn reflects culinary traditions of north Estonia, the role of the city as a fishing port, and historical German influences. Numerous cafés have played a major role in a social life of the city since the 19th century, as have bars, especially in the Kesklinn district.

The martsipan industry in Tallinn has a very long history. The production of martsipan started in the Middle Ages, almost simultaneously in Tallinn (Reval) and Lübeck, both member cities of the Hanseatic League. In 1695, marzipan was mentioned as a medicine, under the designation of Panis Martius, in the price lists of the Tallinn Town Hall Pharmacy. The modern era of martsipan in Tallinn began in 1806, when the Swiss confectioner Lorenz Caviezel set up his confectionery on Pikk Street. In 1864, it was bought and expanded by Georg Stude and now is known as the Maiasmokk café. In the late 19th century martsipan figurines made by Tallinn's confectioners were supplied to the Russian imperial family. 

Arguably, the most symbolic seafood dish of Tallinn is vürtsikilu ("spicy sprat") – salted sprats pickled with a distinctive set of spices including black pepper, allspice and cloves. The making of traditional vürtsikilu is thought to have originated from the city's outskirts. In 1826, the merchants of Tallinn exported 40,000 cans of vürtsikilu to Saint Petersburg. A closely associated dish is kiluvõileib ("sprat-butter-bread") – a traditional rye bread open sandwich covered with a layer of butter and vürtsikilu as the topping. Boiled egg slices and culinary herbs are optional extra toppings. Alcoholic beverages produced in the city include beer, vodka, and liqueurs (such as the eponymous Vana Tallinn). The number of craft beer breweries has expanded sharply in Tallinn over the last decade, entering local and regional markets.

Tourism 
 

What can arguably be considered to be Tallinn's main attractions are located in the Tallinn Old Town (divided into a "lower town" and Toompea hill) which is easily explored on foot. The eastern parts of the city, notably Pirita (with Pirita Convent) and Kadriorg (with Kadriorg Palace) districts, are also popular destinations, and the Estonian Open Air Museum in Rocca al Mare, west of the city, preserves aspects of Estonian rural culture and architecture. The historical wooden suburbs like Kalamaja, Pelgulinn, Kassisaba and Kelmiküla and revitalized industrial areas like Rotermanni Quarter, Noblessner and Dvigatel are also unique places to visit.

Toompea – Upper Town 

This area was once an almost separate town, heavily fortified, and has always been the seat of whatever power that has ruled Estonia. The hill occupies an easily defensible site overlooking the surrounding districts. The major attractions are the medieval Toompea Castle (today housing the Estonian Parliament, the Riigikogu), the Lutheran St Mary's Cathedral, also known as the Dome Church, and the Russian Orthodox Alexander Nevsky Cathedral.

All-linn – Lower Town 
This area is one of the best preserved medieval towns in Europe and the authorities are continuing its rehabilitation. Major sights include the Town Hall square, the city wall and towers (notably "Fat Margaret" and "Kiek in de Kök") as well as a number of medieval churches, including St Olaf's, St. Nicholas' and the Church of the Holy Ghost. The Catholic Cathedral of St Peter and St Paul is also in the Lower Town.

Kadriorg 

Kadriorg Palace, the former palace of Peter the Great, built just after the Great Northern War, now houses the foreign art department of the Art Museum of Estonia, the presidential residence and the surrounding grounds include formal gardens and woodland.

The main building of the Art Museum of Estonia, Kumu (Art Museum), was built in 2006 and lies in Kadriorg park. It houses an encyclopaedic collection of Estonian art, including paintings by Carl Timoleon von Neff, Johann Köler, Eduard Ole, Jaan Koort, Konrad Mägi, Eduard Wiiralt, Henn Roode and Adamson-Eric, among others.

Pirita 

This coastal district is a further 2 kilometres north-east of Kadriorg. The marina was built for the Moscow Olympics of 1980, and boats can be hired on the Pirita River. Two kilometres inland are the Botanic Gardens and the Tallinn TV Tower.

== Transport ==

City transport 

A flat-fare system is used. The ticket-system is based on prepaid RFID cards available in kiosks and post offices. In January 2013, Tallinn became the first European capital to offer a fare-free service on buses, trams and trolleybuses within the city limits. This service is available to residents who register with the municipality.

Air 
There is a tram (Line Number: 4) and local bus connection between the airport and the edge of the city centre (bus no. 2). The nearest railway station Ülemiste is only  from the airport. The construction of the new section of the airport began in 2007 and was finished in summer 2008.

Ferry 

Several ferry operators, Viking Line, Tallink and Eckerö Line, connect Tallinn to Helsinki, Mariehamn, Stockholm, and St. Petersburg. Passenger lines connect Tallinn to Helsinki ( north of Tallinn) in approximately 2–3.5 hours by cruiseferries.

Railroad 

The Elron railway company operates train services from Tallinn to Tartu, Valga, Türi, Viljandi, Tapa, Narva, Koidula. Buses are also available to all these and various other destinations in Estonia, as well as to Saint Petersburg in Russia and Riga, Latvia. The Russian railways company operates a daily international sleeper train service between Tallinn – Moscow.

Tallinn also has a commuter rail service running from Tallinn's main rail station in two main directions: east (Aegviidu) and to several western destinations (Pääsküla, Keila, Riisipere, Turba, Paldiski, and Kloogaranna). These are electrified lines and are used by the Elron railroad company. Stadler FLIRT EMU and DMU units are in service since July 2013.

The Rail Baltica project, which will link Tallinn with Warsaw via Latvia and Lithuania, will connect Tallinn with the rest of the European rail network. A undersea tunnel has been proposed between Tallinn and Helsinki, though it remains at a planning phase.

Roads
The Via Baltica motorway (part of European route E67 from Helsinki to Prague) connects Tallinn to the Lithuanian-Polish border through Latvia. Frequent and affordable long-distance bus routes connect Tallinn with other parts of Estonia.

Notable people

Pre-1900 

 Michael Sittow (ca. 1469–1525), Estonian-born painter. He trained in the tradition of Early Netherlandish painting, significant Flemish painter of the era.
 Count Jacob De la Gardie (1583–1652), statesman and a field marshal of Sweden
 Magnus Gabriel De la Gardie (1622–1686), a Swedish statesman and military man
 Jacob Johan Hastfer (1647–1695), officer and governor of the Livonia province between 1687 and 1695
 Otto von Kotzebue (1787–1846), a Russian officer and navigator in the Imperial Russian Navy. He explored Oceania.
 Alexander Friedrich von Hueck (1802–1842), professor of anatomy at University of Tartu, a notable estophile
 Franz Anton Schiefner (1817–1879), a Baltic German linguist and tibetologist
 Julius Gottlieb Iversen (1823–1900), phalerist and professor of Greek and Latin
 Carl Wilhelm Hiekisch (1840–1901), geographer
 Edmund August Friedrich Russow (1841–1897), biologist, researcher of plant anatomy and histology
 Kristjan Raud (1865–1943), symbolist painter, known for his art style of the primitivism
 Anton Hansen (pseudonym A. H. Tammsaare) (1878–1940), writer. His pentalogy Truth and Justice (Tõde ja õigus) is considered "The Estonian Novel".
 Marie Under (1883–1980), poet, nominated for the Nobel prize in literature multiple times
 Alfred Rosenberg (1893–1946), leading Nazi German ideologue, head of Reich Ministry for the Occupied Eastern Territories, executed for war crimes

1900 to 1930 

 Ants Oras (1900–1982), translator and writer. He studied pause patterns in English Renaissance dramatic blank verse.
 Vidrik "Frits" Rootare (1906–1981), chess player
 Andrus Johani (1906–1941), painter
 Miliza Korjus (1909-1980), Polish-Estonian-American opera singer, Hollywood film actress, nominee for Academy Award for Best Supporting Actress in 1938
 Edmund S. Valtman (1914–2005), Estonian-American cartoonist. He won the 1962 Pulitzer Prize for Editorial Cartooning.
 Evald Okas (1915–2011), painter, probably best known for his portraits of nudes
 Evi Rauer (1915–2004), stage, film and television actress and television director
 Paul Kuusberg (1916–2003), writer, particularly of novellas
 Ellen Liiger (1918–1987), stage, TV, radio and film actress and theatre teacher
 Udo Kasemets (1919–2014), Estonian-born Canadian composer of orchestral, vocal, piano and electroacoustic works
 Jaan Kross (1920–2007), novelist, nominated for the Nobel prize in literature multiple times
 Vincent Zigas (1920–1983), medical officer in Papua New Guinea during the 1950s
 Harry Männil (1920–2010), Estonian-Venezuelan businessman and art collector
 Kaljo Raid (1921–2005), composer, cellist and pastor
 Vello Viisimaa (1928–1991), opera singer and stage actor, appeared mostly in operettas
 Olaf von Wrangel (1928-2009), German journalist (NDR) and politician, member of German Bundestag
 Lennart Georg Meri (1929–2006), politician, writer, film director and statesman, second President of Estonia, 1992 to 2001
 Eino Tamberg (1930–2010), composer, promoter of neoclassicism in Estonian music

1930 to 1950 

 Uno Loop (1930–2021), singer, musician, athlete, actor and educator
 Vladimir-Georg Karassev-Orgusaar (1931–2015), film director, member of the Congress of Estonia
 Martin Puhvel (1933–2016), literature researcher, professor emeritus at McGill University for old and medieval English literature
 Ingrid Rüütel (born 1935), folklorist and philologist, wife of former president Arnold Rüütel
 Peter Peet Silvester (1935–1996), electrical engineer, particularly numerical analysis of electromagnetic fields
 Jüri Arrak (born 1936), artist and painter
 Enn Vetemaa (1936–2017), writer, master of the Estonian Modernist short novel
 Arvo Antonovich Mets, (1937–1997) Russian poet, master of Russian free verse
 Mikk Mikiver (1937–2006), stage and film actor and theater director
 Linnart Mäll (1938–2010), historian, orientalist, translator and politician
 Ene Riisna (born 1938), Estonian-born American television producer, known for her work on the American news show 20/20
 Andres Tarand (born 1940), politician, former Prime Minister of Estonia and Member of the European Parliament
 Leila Säälik (born 1941), stage, film and radio actress
 Paul-Eerik Rummo (born 1942), poet and politician
 Eili Sild (born 1942), stage, film, television and radio actress
 Kalle Lasn (born 1942), Estonian-Canadian film maker, author, magazine editor and activist
 Urjo Kareda (1944–2001), Canadian theatre, music critic, dramaturge and stage director
 Mari Lill (born 1945), stage, film and TV actress
 Sulev Mäeltsemees (born 1947), public administration and local government scholar
 Siiri Oviir (born 1947), politician and former Member of the European Parliament
 Lepo Sumera (1950–2000), composer, teacher and politician

1950 to 1970 

 Urmas Alender (1953–1994), singer and musician, the vocalist of Ruja and Propeller
 Ivo Lill (1953–2019), glass artist
 Ain Lutsepp (born 1954), actor and politician
 Kalle Randalu (born 1956), pianist
 Alexander Leonidovich Goldstein (1957–2006), Russian writer and essayist, resident of Tel Aviv from 1991
 Peeter Järvelaid (born 1957), legal scholar, historian and university professor
 Doris Kareva (born 1958), poet and head of Estonian National Commission in UNESCO
 Anu Lamp (born 1958), stage, film, TV, voice actress and stage director
 Tõnu Õnnepalu (born 1962), pen names Emil Tode and Anton Nigov, poet and author
 Tõnis Lukas (born 1962), politician, Vice-chairman of the Union of Pro Patria and Res Publica
 Marina Kaljurand (born 1962), politician, former Minister of Foreign Affairs
 Kiiri Tamm (born 1962), stage, television and film actress and stage manager
 Tõnu Trubetsky (born 1963), punk rock/glam punk musician, film and music video director and individualist anarchist
 Ivo Uukkivi (born 1965), stage, film, radio, TV actor and producer, founder and singer with the punk band Velikije Luki
 Liina Tennosaar (born 1965), stage, film and television actress
 Juhan Parts (born 1966), politician, Prime Minister of Estonia from 2003 to 2005
 Mart Sander (born 1967), singer, actor, director, author, artist and television host
 Indrek Sirel (born 1970), general of the Estonian Defence Forces

1970 to date 

 Jaan Tallinn (born 1972), programmer, investor and entrepreneur known for involvement in Skype and other projects
 Jan Uuspõld (born 1973), stage, television, radio and film actor and musician
 Urmas Paet (born 1974), politician and Member of the European Parliament
 Ken-Marti Vaher (born 1974), politician, Minister of Justice from 2003 to 2005 and Minister of the Interior from 2011 to 2014
 Urmas Reinsalu (born 1975), politician, Minister of Defence from 2012 to 2014 and Minister of Justice since 2015
 Kristen Michal (born 1975), politician, Minister of economic affairs from 2015 to 2016 and Minister of Justice from 2011 to 2012
 Mailis Reps (born 1975), politician, Minister of Education and Research from 2002 to 2003 and from 2005 to 2007
 Harriet Toompere (born 1975), stage, television, film actress and writer of children's books
 Tanel Ingi (born 1976), stage and film actor, performs primarily at the Ugala theatre
 Katrin Pärn (born 1977), stage, film and television actress and singer
 Johann Urb (born 1977), Estonian-born American actor, producer and model
 Carmen Kass (born 1978), supermodel, ran for European Parliament in 2004, president of the Estonian Chess Federation from 2004 to 2011
 Lauri Lagle (born 1981), stage and film actor, screenwriter, director and playwright
 Ursula Ratasepp (born 1982), stage, film and television actress
 Ott Sepp (born 1982), actor, singer, writer and television presenter
 Katrin Siska (born 1983), musician, member of pop-rock band Vanilla Ninja
 Priit Loog (born 1984), stage, television and film actor
 Tiiu Kuik (born 1987), supermodel
 Pääru Oja (born 1989), stage, film, voice and television actor
 Klaudia Tiitsmaa (born 1990), stage, television and film actress

Architects and conductors 

 Valve Pormeister (1922–2002), architect, the first women to influence the development of Estonian architecture
 Allan Murdmaa (1934–2009), architect, designed Tehumardi war memorial
 Neeme Järvi (born 1937), Estonian-American conductor
 Eri Klas (1939–2016), conductor, leader of the Netherlands Radio Symphony Orchestra
 Tõnu Kaljuste (born 1953), conductor. He conducted with the Estonian National Opera between 1978 and 1995.
 Andres Mustonen (born 1953), conductor and violinist, artistic director of Mustonenfest Tallinn Tel Aviv Festival
 Andres Siim (born 1962), architect, designer of the Nissan Center building in Tallinn
 Paavo Järvi (born 1962), conductor, son of Neeme Järvi
 Margit Mutso (born 1966), architect, designer of the bus station of Rakvere
 Elmo Tiisvald (born 1967), conductor, conductor of Opera Studio at Estonian Academy of Music and Theatre
 Kaisa Roose (born 1969), music conductor with Malmö Opera and Music Theatre
 Siiri Vallner (born 1972), architect, designer of the Museum of Occupations in Tallinn
 Anu Tali (born 1972), conductor, music director of the Sarasota Orchestra
 Eero Endjärv (born 1973), architect. He designed the villa in Otepää in Southern Estonia.
 Katrin Koov (born 1973), architect, designer of the Concert Hall of Pärnu
 Mikk Murdvee (born 1980), Estonian-Finnish conductor and violinist. He lives in Helsinki.

Sport 
 Albert Kusnets (1902–1942), middleweight Greco-Roman wrestler. He competed in the 1924 and 1928 Summer Olympics.
 Valter Palm (1905–1994), welterweight professional boxer. He competed in 1924 and 1928 Summer Olympics.
 Toomas Krõm (born 1971), footballer, 11 caps for Estonia
 Gert Kullamäe (born 1971), professional basketball player
 Toomas Kallaste (born 1971), footballer, 42 international caps for Estonia
 Indrek Pertelson (born 1971) judoka. He won bronze at the 2000 and 2004 Summer Olympics.
 Mart Poom (born 1972), footballer and coach, goalkeeping coach of the national team
 Martin Müürsepp (born 1974), basketball player and coach
 Sergei Pareiko (born 1977), goalkeeper, 65 appearances for Estonia
 Andres Oper (born 1977), footballer and coach, assistant manager of the national team
 Kristen Viikmäe (born 1979), footballer. She played for JK Nõmme Kalju.
 Irina Embrich (born 1980), épée fencer
 Joel Lindpere (born 1981), footballer. He made 107 appearances for Estonia.
 Remy Põld (born 1992), basketball player
 Anett Kontaveit (born 1995), tennis player, highest-ranked Estonian singles player
 Ralf Aron (born 1998), race car driver
 Jüri Vips (born 2000), race car driver, competitor in the FIA Formula 2 Championship
 Paul Aron (born 2004), race car driver

Twin towns – sister cities

Tallinn is twinned with:

 Annapolis, United States
 Dartford, United Kingdom
 Ghent, Belgium
 Groningen, Netherlands
 Kiel, Germany
 Kyiv, Ukraine
 Kotka, Finland
 Malmö, Sweden
 Riga, Latvia
 Schwerin, Germany
 Venice, Italy
 Vilnius, Lithuania
 Elazıg, Turkey

Gallery

See also 

 Legends of Tallinn
 Revaltoppe
 Tallinn Marathon
 Walls of Tallinn

Notes

References

Bibliography

Books and articles
 Burch, Stuart. An unfolding signifier: London's Baltic exchange in Tallinn. Journal of Baltic Studies 39.4 (2008): 451–473.
 Hallas, Karin, ed. 20th Century Architecture in Tallinn (Tallinn, The Museum of Estonian Architecture, 2000).

 Kattago, Siobhan. War memorials and the politics of memory: The Soviet war memorial in Tallinn. Constellations 16.1 (2009): 150–166. online
 Naum, Magdalena. Multi-ethnicity and material exchanges in Late Medieval Tallinn. European Journal of Archaeology 17.4 (2014): 656–677. online
 Õunapuu, Piret. The Tallinn department of the Estonian National museum: History and developments. Folklore: Electronic Journal of Folklore 48 (2011): 163–196.
 Pullat, Raimo. Brief history of Tallinn (Estopol, 1999).

Travel guides

External links 

 
 The Website of the City of Tallinn (official)
 Visit Tallinn official city guide
 Panoramas of Tallinn Old Town 
 3D model of Tallinn Old Town
 Historical footage of Tallinn, 1920 (archive), filmportal.de
 

 
Capitals in Europe 
Cities and towns in Estonia
Populated coastal places in Estonia 
Municipalities of Estonia 
Populated places in Harju County 
Port cities and towns in Estonia 
Port cities and towns of the Baltic Sea 
Viking Age populated places 
Members of the Hanseatic League 
World Heritage Sites in Estonia